Nicholas LaRoche (born July 29, 1983) is an American figure skater. He is the 2002 United States National Jr. Men's Figure Skating Champion, Nebelhorn Trophy bronze medalist, 2007 Ondrej Nepela Memorial silver medalist, and placed tenth at the 2002 World Junior Championships.

Career
LaRoche debuted on the ISU Junior Grand Prix series in 1999. He won the junior title at the 2002 U.S. Championships. He was assigned to the 2002 World Junior Championships where he placed tenth. Later that year, he won a bronze medal on the JGP series, in Germany.

From 2003, LaRoche competed on the senior level at the U.S. Championships. He won the bronze medal at the 2003 Nebelhorn Trophy and silver at the 2007 Ondrej Nepela Memorial. His last competition was the 2009 nationals. On April 13, 2009, he announced his retirement on his official site.

LaRoche coaches at the Toyota Training Center in El Segundo, California. He also runs the US Athletic Foundation, which he started with his sister Tricia, to assist athletes in all sports obtain funding.

Personal life 
LaRoche's private life has been marred by tragedy. In 2003, his older brother, David, died at the age of 23.  On July 1, 2008, his father, William LaRoche, apparently bludgeoned to death Nicholas' mother, Bernadette, before killing himself.

Programs

Competitive highlights

References

External links
 Official site
 US Athletic Foundation
 
 Nicholas LaRoche at IceNetwork

American male single skaters
1983 births
Living people
People from Gardner, Massachusetts
Sportspeople from Worcester County, Massachusetts